Henri (born 16 April 1955) is the Grand Duke of Luxembourg. He has reigned since 7 October 2000. Henri, the eldest son of Grand Duke Jean and Princess Joséphine-Charlotte of Belgium, is a first cousin of King Philippe of Belgium. In 2019, Henri's net worth was estimated around US$4 billion.

Childhood
Prince Henri was born on 16 April 1955, at the Betzdorf Castle in Luxembourg as the second child and first son of Hereditary Grand Duke Jean of Luxembourg and his wife, Princess Joséphine-Charlotte of Belgium. His father was the eldest son of Grand Duchess Charlotte of Luxembourg by her husband, Prince Félix of Bourbon-Parma. His mother was the only daughter of King Leopold III of Belgium by his first wife, Princess Astrid of Sweden. The prince's godparents were the Prince of Liège (his maternal uncle) and Princess Marie Gabriele (his paternal aunt).

Henri has four siblings: Archduchess Marie Astrid of Austria (born 1954), Prince Jean of Luxembourg (born 1957), Princess Margaretha of Liechtenstein (born 1957) and Prince Guillaume of Luxembourg (born 1963).

On 12 November 1964, when Henri was nine, his grandmother abdicated and his father became Grand Duke. By two sovereign decisions of 14 April 1973 the Grand Duke decided that "Henri will be considered as having reached the age of majority as from 16 April 1973, the date on which he will have reached the age of eighteen years" and "that His Royal Highness Prince Henri will bear, in His capacity as Heir Apparent to the Crown of the Grand Duchy of Luxembourg and of the Grand-Ducal Trust, the title of Hereditary Grand Duke of Luxembourg, Crown Prince of Nassau, Prince of Bourbon of Parma."

Education
Henri was educated in Luxembourg and in France, where he obtained his baccalaureate in 1974, after which he undertook military officer training at the Royal Military Academy Sandhurst, England on the Standard Military Course (SMC) 7. He then studied political science at University of Geneva and the Graduate Institute of International Studies, graduating in 1980.

Constitutional position

Prince Henri became heir apparent to the Luxembourg throne on the abdication of his paternal grandmother, Grand Duchess Charlotte of Luxembourg, on 12 November 1964. From 1980 to 1998, he was a member of the Council of State.

On 4 March 1998, Prince Henri was appointed as lieutenant representative by his father, Grand Duke Jean, meaning that he assumed most of his father's constitutional powers. On 7 October 2000, immediately following the abdication of his father, Henri acceded as Grand Duke of Luxembourg and took the constitutional oath before the Chamber of Deputies later that day.

Euthanasia and constitutional reform controversies
On 2 December 2008, it was announced that Grand Duke Henri had stated he would refuse to give his assent to a new law on euthanasia that had been passed earlier in the year by the Chamber of Deputies. Under the constitution then, the grand duke "sanctions and promulgates the laws" meaning the need for the grand duke's sanction or approval was required in order for laws to take effect. In the absence of clarity on the long-term implications for the constitutional position of the grand duke posed by such a refusal, it was announced by Prime Minister Jean-Claude Juncker that a constitutional amendment would be brought forward. 

The Luxembourg ruling house had tried to block a decision by Parliament only once before, when Grand Duchess Marie-Adelaïde refused to sign a bill in 1912 to reduce the role of Roman Catholic priests within the education system. The ultimate solution was that the grand duke would be declared unable to perform his duty temporarily. This was similar to the "escape route" provided to his uncle King Baudouin of Belgium when he refused to sign an abortion law in 1991; thus the law could take effect without the signature of the grand duke, but also without the need to enact far-reaching changes in the constitution.

Article 34 of the constitution was subsequently amended to remove the term "assent", leaving the relevant provision to read: "The Grand Duke promulgates the laws..." As a result, his signature is still needed but it is clear that his signature is automatic and that he has no freedom of decision. The head of state no longer has to "sanction" laws for them to take effect, as the officeholder merely promulgates them.

Role and interests
As the head of a constitutional monarchy, Grand Duke Henri's duties are primarily representative. However, he retains the constitutional power to appoint the prime minister and government, to dissolve the Chamber of Deputies, to promulgate laws and to accredit ambassadors.

Grand Duke Henri is commander-in-chief of the Luxembourg Army, in which he holds the rank of general. He is also an honorary major in the British RAF Regiment.

One of the grand duke's main functions is to represent Luxembourg in the field of foreign affairs. In May 2001, Grand Duke Henri and Grand Duchess Maria Teresa undertook their first foreign state visit to Spain at the invitation of King Juan Carlos and Queen Sofía of Spain.

Grand Duke Henri is a member of the International Olympic Committee (IOC), a member of The Mentor Foundation (established by the World Health Organization) and a director of the Charles Darwin Trust for the Galápagos Islands.

The grand duke lives with his family at Berg Castle in Luxembourg. He also has a holiday home in Cabasson, a village in the commune of Bormes-les-Mimosas in Southern France.

Marriage and family 
While studying in Geneva, Henri met the  Cuban-born María Teresa Mestre y Batista, who was also a political science student. They married in Luxembourg in a civil ceremony on 4 February 1981 and a religious ceremony on 14 February 1981 with the previous consent of the grand duke, dated 7 November 1980; and they remain married. The couple has five children:
Guillaume, Hereditary Grand Duke of Luxembourg, 
Prince Félix of Luxembourg, 
Prince Louis of Luxembourg, 
Princess Alexandra of Luxembourg, and 
Prince Sébastien of Luxembourg.

Media and publicity

Since the accession of Henri to the Grand Ducal Throne in 2000, the court's approach to media and publicity has varied markedly. In 2002, Grand Duke Henri expressly identified himself with a press conference called by Grand Duchess Maria Teresa with a view to discussing with journalists the shortcomings of her personal relations with her mother-in-law Grand Duchess Joséphine-Charlotte.

In contrast, when the grand ducal couple's first grandchild was born in 2006, the Court Circular pointedly omitted to mention the event, probably as the father Prince Louis was not married at the time. However, the pregnancy was announced in 2005, so the country was informed that the prince and his girlfriend were going to be parents. The press also had access to the child's baptism.

The grand ducal family's approach to media and publicity issues has given rise to media comment regarding the quality of communications advice which has been sought and followed. As well as the public airing of the difficulties between the grand duchess and her mother-in-law, several other events have resulted in adverse publicity, most notably: in 2004, the opening of parliament by the grand duke in person, the first time in over 100 years the monarch had done so; in 2005, the grand duke announced he intended to vote in favour of the European Constitution in the impending referendum, only to be reminded by senior politicians that he had no such right. The proposed sale of large tracts of the Gruenewald in the summer of 2006 was shortly followed by the proposed sale (cancelled shortly afterwards) at Sotheby's of recently deceased Grand Duchess Joséphine-Charlotte's effects.

Waringo report
On 31 January 2020, the Waringo report was released, a governmental report on the internal workings of the monarchy that had been compiled by Jeannot Waringo, former Financial Director of Luxembourg. The report identified significant problems in terms of staff management at the Palace resulting in a high turnover rate and an atmosphere of fear. It noted that internal communications were almost nonexistent. Waringo indicated that the most important staff decisions were made by the Grand Duchess. There was no division of staff for personal use and that for official functions. Waringo was also not able to determine if the grand ducal couple's private activities were financed by the State or not. The report calls for a reform of the monarchy.
The Court responded that "(i)n the interests of greater transparency and modernization, the Court will contribute constructively to the implementation of the improvements proposed in this report."

Health
On 3 February 2011, Henri was admitted to the Centre Hospitalier de Luxembourg on falling ill. Shortly after, the grand ducal court issued a statement saying that he was to undergo an angioplasty. The day after, the communications chief announced that the procedure had been a success. "The state of His Royal Highness' health is not disturbing," the statement read, before stating the grand duke may leave the hospital within the next few days. Although the reason has not formally been disclosed, it is reported that the grand duke felt ill after waking that day, and the court physician noticed circulation problems. It was then that he was rushed to hospital, to the cardiac unit, and was discharged the following day.

Honours

National 

 Co-Grand Master and Knight of the Order of the Gold Lion of the House of Nassau
 Grand Master and Grand Cross  of the military and civil Order of Adolphe of Nassau
 Grand Master and Grand Cross of the Order of the Oak Crown
 Grand Master of the Order of Merit of the Grand Duchy of Luxembourg
Grand Collar of the European Foundation of Merit

Foreign 

: Grand Star of the Decoration of Honour for Services to the Republic of Austria
: Grand Cordon of the Order of Leopold (1994)
:
 Grand Cross of the Order of the Southern Cross
 Grand Collar of the Order of the Southern Cross (3 December 2007)
: Member 1st Class of the Amílcar Cabral Order (12 March 2015)
: Knight of the Order of the Elephant
: Collar of the Order of the Cross of Terra Mariana (5 May 2003)
: Grand Cross of the Order of the Legion of Honour
: Grand Cross with Collar of the Order of the White Rose of Finland (November 2008)
: Grand Cross Special Class of the Order of Merit of the Federal Republic of Germany
: Grand Cross of the Order of the Redeemer (July 2001)
:  Knight Grand Cross with Collar of the Order of Merit of the Italian Republic (14 March 2003)
 : Collar of the Supreme Order of the Chrysanthemum (27 November 2017)
: 
 Commander Grand Cross with Chain of the Order of the Three Stars (5 December 2006)
 Recipient of the 1st Class of Cross of Recognition (13 March 2023)
: Grand Cross of the National Order of Mali (9 November 2005)
:
 Grand Cross of the Order of the Crown
 Knight Grand Cross of the Order of the Netherlands Lion (24 April 2006)
: Grand Cross with Collar of the Order of St. Olav (18 April 1996)
: Knight of the Order of the White Eagle (2014)
:
 Grand Collar of the Order of Prince Henry (6 May 2005)
 Grand Collar of the Military Order of Saint James of the Sword (7 September 2010)
 Grand Collar of the Order of Liberty (23 May 2017)
 Grand Collar of the Military Order of Christ (11 May 2022)
: Collar of the Order of the Star of Romania (2004)
: Grand Cross of the National Order of the Lion (2018)
: Grand Cross (or 1st Class) of the Order of the White Double Cross (2002)
: Bailiff Grand Cross of Honour and Devotion of the Sovereign Military Order of Malta.
:
 Knight of the Order of the Golden Fleece (13 April 2007)
 Collar of the Order of Charles III (11 May 2001)
 Grand Cross of the Order of Charles III (8 July 1980)
:
 Knight of the Order of the Seraphim (12 September 1983)
 Recipient of the 50th Birthday Badge Medal of King Carl XVI Gustaf
: Member of the Order of the State of Republic of Turkey (19 November 2013)
:
 Honorary Knight Grand Cross of the Royal Victorian Order
 Recipient of the Sandhurst Medal (22 September 2020)
: Knight with the Collar of the Order of Pope Pius IX

References

External links

Official website
The Mentor Foundation

1955 births
20th-century Roman Catholics
21st-century Roman Catholics
Grand Dukes of Luxembourg
International Olympic Committee members
Living people
House of Luxembourg-Nassau
Luxembourgian Roman Catholics
Members of the Council of State of Luxembourg
People from Betzdorf, Luxembourg
Graduates of the Royal Military Academy Sandhurst
University of Geneva alumni
Graduate Institute of International and Development Studies alumni

Grand Crosses of the Order of Merit of the Grand Duchy of Luxembourg
Knights of the Golden Fleece of Spain
Recipients of the Grand Star of the Decoration for Services to the Republic of Austria
Recipients of the Collar of the Order of the Cross of Terra Mariana
Knights Grand Cross with Collar of the Order of Merit of the Italian Republic
Knights Grand Cross of the Order of Pope Pius IX
Knights of Malta
Grand Crosses of the National Order of Mali
Grand Collars of the Order of Saint James of the Sword
Grand Crosses of the Order of Saint James of the Sword
Grand Collars of the Order of Prince Henry
Grand Crosses of the Order of Prince Henry
Grand Crosses of the Order of the Star of Romania
Honorary Knights Grand Cross of the Royal Victorian Order
Grand Collars of the Order of Liberty
Luxembourgian billionaires